Heart of Jesus can refer to:
The Sacred Heart of Jesus as an object of religious devotion
Sacred Heart Church
Heart of Jesus (statue), a statue in Lupeni, Romania
A common name for plants in the genus Caladium